Gramsbergen is a railway station located in Gramsbergen, Netherlands. The station was opened on 1 July 1905 and is located on the Zwolle–Emmen railway. The train services are operated by Arriva.

Train services

Bus services

External links
NS website 
Dutch Public Transport journey planner 

Railway stations in Overijssel
Railway stations opened in 1905
Hardenberg
1905 establishments in the Netherlands
Railway stations in the Netherlands opened in the 20th century